The 1985–86 Whitbread Round the World Race was the fourth edition of the Whitbread Round the World Race (now known as the Volvo Ocean Race). Fifteen boats started out from Southampton on 28 September 1985 for the around-the-world race.

L'Esprit d'Équipe, skippered by Lionel Péan, won the race in a corrected time of 111 days 23 hours. Philips Innovator was second, and Swan 651 Fazer Finland third. UBS Switzerland was named first on elapsed time, with Lion New Zealand as runner-up. Drum (carrying its owner, the pop star Simon Le Bon) finished just a breath behind.

Route

Results

References

The Ocean Race
Sport in Southampton
Punta del Este
Whitbread Round The World Race, 1985-86
Whitbread Round The World Race, 1985-86
Sports competitions in Cape Town
Sports competitions in Auckland
1986 in New Zealand sport
1980s in Cape Town
20th century in Cape Town